ʿAlāʾ ad-Dīn Muḥammad III (1211–1255), more commonly known simply as Ala ad-Din, son of Jalāl al-Dīn Ḥassan III, was the 26th Nizāri Ismāʿilī Imām. He ruled the Nizari Ismaili state from 1221 to 1255. He was a respected scholar and the spiritual and worldly leader of the Nizari Ismailis. The intellectual life of Persia flourished during his 34-year reign. He was known for his tolerance and pluralism. His reign witnessed the beginnings of the Mongol conquests of Persia and the eastern Muslim world. He was assassinated by an unknown perpetrator on 1 December 1255, and was succeeded by his eldest son Rukn al-Din Khurshah in 1255.

Life

Alauddin Muhammad or Muhammad III was born in 609/1213. He succeeded his father at the age of 9. The administration of state affairs had been governed by his gifted mother for about six years, which was the first instance of a woman administering Alamut. 
The period of six years (618/1221 to 624/1227) was very peaceful in Alamut, during which time the Imam's mother seems to have deposed many incapable governors in Rudhbar and Kohistan. It seems that some governors and officers had misused their powers in that period. In 624/1227, Alauddin Muhammad took power upon the death of his mother at the age of 15 or 16 and dealt iron-handed with the persons misusing the powers. Most of them turned against him and went to live in Qazvin. In order to cover up their defalcations, they spread rumors against the Imam in bitter sarcasm. Some of them went on to propagate that the brain of Alauddin Muhammad had been affected a few months before 624/1227 when a physician operated on him, causing an excessive loss of blood. The opposition was however surmounted very soon. 

Under Muhammad III's reign, the conformity with the Sunni initiated by his father was gradually and quietly reversed and his community increasingly regarded itself openly as Ismaili Shi'ite.

Education and intellectual leadership 

Alāʾ ad-Dīn Muḥamma was an esteemed scholar who studied spiritual, philosophical and jurisprudence sciences. He was well-known for his mystical statements, which reflected his profound knowledge. He established a special school to train da'is in the correct principles of inviting people to Nizari Isma'ili Islam.

He authored a seminal constitution for the Nizari Ismailis, entitled ‘Murids’. One of the da’is, Shams Alden Ibn Ahmad Ibn Yaqoub Altaibi (شمس الدين بن أحمد بن يعقوب الطيبي) has documented that the treatise named "The Constitution and the Call to the Believers to attendance"  ("الدستور و دعوة المؤمنين إلى الحضور")  was delivered to him by  Da’i Nasir al Din al Tusi, who obtained it directly from Ala’ ad-Din Muhammad. This treatise also mentioned that Ala’ ad-Din Muhammad dictated to his Hujja, Shams Alden Ibn Ahmad Ibn Yaqoub Altaibi, a Constitution called  “The Constitution of Mawlana Ala'audeen " which displayed the high intellectual and scientific capacities of the Nizari Ismaili Imam.

Alāʾ ad-Dīn Muḥammad offered special attention to the learned discussions and debates that took place in Alamut. He assigned one day per week to philosophical and doctrinal debates between da'is guiding them to polish their skills for dialectical debating, offering pedagogical and argumentation techniques that made them very proficient in dialectical discussions and arguments.

All-Dādīkhī, Qays b. Manṣūr (d.655/1257), the Syrian Nizārī author قيس بن منصور الداديخي  was his da'i to Syria, He had important philosophical treatises as Risālat al-asābīʿ, ed., ʿĀrif Tāmir, in his Khams rasāʾil Ismāʿīliyya, pp. 057–079 which discussed esoteric exegesis (taʾwīl) of certain Qurʾanic verses and Ismaili theology related to the number seven. All-Dādīkhī, Qays b. Manṣūr was a talented poet, who was expressed in the presence of Alāʾ ad-Dīn Muḥammad and his son Imam Rukn al-Din Khurshah verses to affirm the Fatimid origin of the Nizari Imam Alāʾ ad-Dīn Muḥammad. The title of that poem is "Degree of the Fatimid Imam is glorified" قدر الإمام الفاطمي معظم

More recent studies in the last decade have revealed that intellectual life flourished during the long reign of Ala al-Din Muhammad and received a special impetus from the influx of outside scholars who now fled the first waves of the Mongol invasions and found refuge in the Nizari fortress communities of Persia. Foremost among such scholars who availed themselves of the Nizari libraries and patronage of learning, was Nasir al Din al Tusi (d 672/1274) who made major contributions to Nizari Ismaili thought of the late Alamut period during his three decades of stay among them. As elaborated in his spiritual autobiography, entitled ‘Sayr va suluk’, al Tusi in fact converted to Ismailism sometime during his prolonged association with the Nizari Ismailis.

Tolerance and pluralism 

Ala al-Din Muhammad was very inclusive and pluralistic in his outlook. He granted patronage and shelter to various scholars from surrounding countries destroyed by the Mongol invasion. He granted access to libraries and offered all kinds of support. Nasir al-Din al-Tusi (d 672/1274) was one of his prominent da'is who developed precious contributions to Ismaili theology.

Ala al-Din Muhammad's alliance with the larger Muslim community enlarged the boundaries of Nizari political aspirations. The grand vision of world domination returned for a time. Purely local squabbles were replaced by ambitious diplomatic activities in lands as far away as Europe and Mongolia, while a Nizari religious mission was firmly established in India. Financial tribute for their safety was received from political leaders as distant as Germany, Aragon and Yemen.

Besides his missions to create a Christian-Muslim coalition in anticipation of the Mongols invasion, he was among the first to send peaceful messages to the Great Khan Guyuk in Mongolia in full collaboration with the Sunni Abbasid Caliphate.  The relationship with Abbasid Caliphate during his leadership was friendly and cordial.

During his 34-year imamate, he sent da'is to Sind to establish Nizāri Ismāʿilī Islam in the Indian subcontinent.

Maymun-Diz fortress 
Maymūn-Diz (Persian: میمون دز‎) was a major castle with a unique construction style built during the reign of Alāʾ ad-Dīn Muḥammad on a high rock with a sharp cliff, it played a very important role for the Nizari Ismailis of the Alamut period, which is well captured historical records.

Silver coins 

Silver coins were used in 618 AH in the early period of Nizari Ismāʿilī Imām Alāʾ ad-Dīn Muḥammad. It is important to note  that such coins had not existed in Saljuq Iran until that time.

Publication bias 

There is academic evidence that many citations about Alāʾ ad-Dīn Muḥammad reflect the religious bias of Atâ-Malek Juvayni, who alleged that his rule was described as "cruel, imperious, sadistic, alcoholic, and unpredictable." Atâ-Malek Juvayni was an important Sunni official of the Mongol empire which invaded and destroyed the Ismaili state.

The fantastical description of Marco Polo regarding Ala al-Din Muhammad III, the penultimate Lord of the Alamut, was copied by other European writers without verification and has caught the imagination of many readers, but lacks historical authenticity. The contemporary historian Juwayni, an avowed enemy of the Nizaris who accompanied the Mongol leader Hulegu to Alamut in 1256 and carefully inspected the fortress before its destruction, does not report discovering any 'secret gardens of paradise' as claimed in Marco Polo's popular account. Even though Juwayni mentions that he selected many 'choice books' from the famous Alamut library for his own purposes, he unfortunately burned those books that he did not like.

See also 
 Aga Khan
 Fatimids
 List of Ismaili imams

References

External links
 Alauddin Muhammad (618–653/1221–1255)
 ʿALĀʾ-AL-DĪN MOḤAMMAD or Muhammad III of Alamut

Nizari imams
1211 births
1255 deaths
13th-century Ismailis
13th-century Islamic religious leaders